The Mid-Ohio Regional Planning Commission (MORPC) is the metropolitan planning organization for Central Ohio, including the state capitol, Columbus.

MORPC covers Franklin, Fairfield, Perry, Hocking, Logan, Union, Delaware, Morrow, and Knox counties, including nearly all of their municipalities. The organization also covers the cities of Ashville, Circleville, Chillicothe, and Johnstown.

History
MORPC was founded in 1943, as the Franklin County Planning Commission. It gradually grew to encompass multiple counties.

The organization was headquartered in Downtown Columbus until 2007, when it moved into the city's nearby Brewery District.

See also
 LinkUS
 List of metropolitan planning organizations in the United States

References

External links
 

Metropolitan planning organizations
1943 establishments in Ohio
Organizations based in Columbus, Ohio
Organizations established in 1943
Brewery District